Macrocheles minervae is a species of mite in the family Macrochelidae.

References

minervae
Articles created by Qbugbot
Animals described in 1982